Arif Niftullayev was a wrestler from Baku, Azerbaijan. He was a gold medalist in Greco-Roman wrestling at the 1978 World Wrestling Championship, competing for the Soviet Union.

References

Living people
Soviet male sport wrestlers
World Wrestling Championships medalists
Year of birth missing (living people)